Landes is a surname. Notable people with the surname include:

 Aaron Landes (1929–2014), rabbi
 Alejandro Landes (born 1980), film director
 Bertha Knight Landes (1868–1943), mayor of Seattle
 Daniel Landes, rabbi
 David Landes (1924–2013), economist
 Dawn Landes (born 1980), musician
 Jimmy Landes (born 1992), American football long 
 Lewis Landes (1891–1972), U.S. Army colonel
 Michael Landes (born 1972), American actor
 Richard Landes (born 1949), historian
 Roger Landes (1916–2008), agent and radio operator during World War II
 Ruth Landes (1908–1991), anthropologist
 Silas Z. Landes (1842–1910), American politician
 Stan Landes (1923–1994), baseball umpire 
 Steve Landes (born 1959), American politician
 William Landes (born 1939), economist